Taça Rio, or Rio Trophy, is an annual Rio de Janeiro football tournament. It is the second stage competition of the Campeonato Carioca, the state football championship in Rio de Janeiro. It has been organized since 1982 by the Rio de Janeiro State Football Federation.

Vasco da Gama is the most successful club in the tournament's history, having won the title eleven times.

Format
Sixteen teams of the competition are divided into the two same groups of Taça Guanabara, which is previously held. However, unlike Taça Guanabara, each team of Taça Rio play against every team of the other group, rather than teams of the same group, once. The top team from each group play against the second team of the other group in the semi-finals in a single match, with the winner qualified for the final of the competition. The winner of Taça Rio plays against the winner of Taça Guanabara in the Campeonato Carioca Final.

History

Taça Rio was created in 1982, as an equivalent to Taça Guanabara. While Taça Guanabara is the name of the trophy given to the Campeonato Carioca first stage winner, Taça Rio is the trophy given to the second stage champion.

Taça Rio was not held only in 1994 and 1995, during the time format of Taça Guanabara was changed. During these two years, though teams were still divided into two groups, the matches that played against teams from other group, traditional matches of Taça Rio, became the second phase of the group stage of the Taça Guanabara. Therefore, there was no need for the Taça Rio to be held. 

In 1996, the traditional competition format returned, and the Taça Rio was contested again and the trophy was again given to the Campeonato Carioca second round champion.

List of champions

Titles by team
 Vasco da Gama 11 titles
 Flamengo 9 titles
 Botafogo 7 titles
 Fluminense 4 titles
 Madureira 2 titles
 America 1 title
 Americano 1 title
 Bangu 1 title
 Boavista 1 title
 Resende 1 title
 Volta Redonda 1 title

See also
Campeonato Carioca
Taça Guanabara

Reference

External links
Taça Rio at RSSSF

Campeonato Carioca
Football cup competitions in Rio de Janeiro (state)